Q-ZAR (called Quasar in the UK, Ireland, and called LaserGame in Sweden) is a type of laser tag that was developed by Geoff Haselhurst, Peter Robertson and Omnitronics in Perth, Western Australia.  The rights were later sold to Leisureplex Ltd, a company based in Ireland which in turn sold them to Q-ZAR International based in Dallas, Texas.

Gameplay

Like other laser tag games, Q-ZAR is played with a gun (or "phaser") that fires harmless beams of infrared light that are detected by equipment worn by the players. There is also a laser pulse on firing, though it is for visual effects only. The basic mechanism of the game revolves around shooting (called tagging) each other or stationary objects.

The standard game of Q-ZAR involves two teams: the red team and the green team (Quasar Elite involves a red and blue team).  Each team has a Headquarters (aka "HQ" or "base") to defend from the other team.  The goal of the game is to score the most points for the team.  The player can achieve this by either deactivating the opponents' HQ or by tagging the opposing team's players. Players may deactivate the opponents' HQ by tagging it twice leaving a few seconds between. The winning team is determined by the team with the most points at the end of the game.

Upon being tagged, the pack vibrates, makes an explosion noise and the player who has been tagged has a window of around one second to fire off a "reflex" shot (providing no shot was fired in the previous second) before the penalty sequence starts.  After the one second has passed, the six-second penalty sequence starts. During the penalty sequence, for the first 3 seconds, the player may not be tagged and may not tag other people.  For the final three seconds, a player may be tagged, but may not tag other people.  If a player is tagged during this period, the process starts over (including getting a 1-second reflex shot).

The back of the phaser has a simple LED display.  When a pack is not energised, there is a number above a "U" showing.  The number is the pack's ID number.  The U means that the pack is "Un-energized."  When a pack is on during normal play, the top number is the number of lives remaining, the bottom is the number of shots (when a player is out of shots, they lose a life, getting a "Good Shot" resets the shot counter).  When a player re-energizes, the display shows how many times the player has energised.  When a player is out of lives, the display flashes the amount of time left in the game.  If a player holds the trigger down for three seconds, either display will show the time remaining or a "bomb" will be triggered that can deactivate all vests around the player, including those on the same team.

History
The game of Quasar was created by inventor Geoff Haselhurst around 1987 in Perth, Australia. The original system was sold to Irish investors in 1991. The name Quasar is still in use in the UK and Ireland, but due to trouble securing the name Quasar in other countries, the courier company was renamed Q-ZAR for worldwide operations.  As part of the international expansion of Q-ZAR the company relocated to the USA. However, manufacturing operations remained in Ireland. In 1996 the company joined NASDAQ and rolled out a short-lived, child-based expansion called Q-KIDZ. Q-ZAR missed the first interest payment for a $30-million bridge loan in October 1997 and was forced into bankruptcy by the lender on November 5, 1997.

In 1995, a company called Q-Support sprung up, run by a past manager of several Q-ZAR centers, Zac Adams. Adams offered support and parts to existing Q-ZAR centers, greatly undercutting its corporate offices. Despite threats from Q-Zar corporate, most centers started purchasing parts from Q-Support, leading to the closure of the corporate parts and service center shortly before they went bankrupt. Q-Support closed in 1999 due to dwindling numbers of centers still being operated and a narrow vertical market.

In 2000, Will Low purchased some of the assets of Q-ZAR calling it Q-ZAR World Wide. Low claimed ownership of the Q-ZAR trademark, but failed in a class-action lawsuit to force existing centers to pay a license fee to him. In 2002 Laser Light Entertainment, Inc. purchased the Concord, California, location. In 2003, J. R. Robles purchased the Q-ZAR assets held by Jarvis Entertainment and formed the company Q-ZAR USA. Laser Light Entertainment, Inc. successfully completed the registration of the Q-ZAR trademark in 2008. This registration gives them control of the Q-ZAR trademark from 1999–present. In 2008 Laser Light Entertainment, Inc. also purchased the Q-ZAR assets of Low. Laser Light Entertainment, Inc. has been selling Q-ZAR equipment, Q-ZAR System Sales since 2003. Quasar in the UK, Ireland, Europe and Asia remains supported by Quasar UK (now Quasar Manufacturing LTD). In 2001 Quasar Manufacturing Ltd (once Quasar UK) took over Q-ZAR and Quasar Trade Marks for UK, Ireland and Europe and in 2005 released a new version named Quasar Elite (Q-Zar Mark VI version) with revised software and hardware. In 2009 Quasar Manufacturing started testing Mark VII Wireless Q-Zar equipment. Laser Light Entertainment and Quasar Manufacturing made arrangements to distribute Quasar Elite Wireless in the United States (from the end of 2011 on), replacing previous equipment.

Hardware 
Quasar vests have been revised a number of times (Mark I to VII).  The original system used a strap based vest, metal housed front and back sensor areas and a hand-held pistol.  The back sensor contained the battery, the front sensor contained the CPU and speaker.  The pistol was small and contained few parts.

A major revision was the Mark IIIB system which moved most of the electronics into a larger and heavier two handled gun.  The speaker, battery, display and CPU were all moved to the gun, leaving the front and back as sensor only areas.  The strap based vest was retained.

Prior to the international launch of Quasar as Q-ZAR the vests were redesigned again (Mark IV).  The gun shape was retained, however, it was remoulded in a lighter plastic, greatly reducing the weight of the gun.  In addition, the strap based vest was dropped in favour of brightly coloured plastic body Armour style vests.

Two systems were developed for Q-ZAR as its next generation system.  Neither of these systems made it to production. The first system was discontinued possibly because of Q-ZAR defaulting on a payment.  The second system, IQ, was in development when the company collapsed.

After the collapse of Q-ZAR, Quasar Manufacturing withdraw remaining Q-Zar available stocks from United States market, keeping up basic components production, to give support to open European sites.
In 2005 Quasar UK renamed themselves Quasar Manufacturing and launched Quasar Elite (Mark VI), which used a smaller gun and body armour to accommodate younger players.  In addition, Quasar Elite changed the green equipment to blue to assist those with color blindness.  The new version dropped the elasticated side straps in favor of seat-belt style straps with buckles as these were found to be more durable.

In 2009, Quasar Manufacturing started projecting Quasar Elite Wireless Equipment (Mark VII), ready at the end of 2011. The new system dropped the infra-red Unit-Gun connection used in older systems and used more advanced radio frequency linking  
Packs are the main component of the Q-ZAR system. They are the vest and the phaser unit and they are worn by all players in the game. Packs store information about players and allow players to play the game.
Network boxes may be configured in one of three ways. As an Energizer, Network Boxes transmit game data between packs and the main computer and allow players to gain more lives depending on the game setup. As an Headquarters, teams may attack and defend them.  As bombs, the Network Boxes can shoot players.
Scoreboards display scores and the time remaining in the game.
Software on an i386 PC is used to set up games, track scores, and print out scorecards. The older Q-ZAR software was MS-DOS based, but a Windows-based version is shipped with Quasar Elite, and other Windows version are available from other developers.
Marshall Gun/Phaser. A special gun that is capable of changing team and energizing packs.
Handicap Gun/Phaser. A special gun that is capable of learning during a game and adjusting the settings to assist those with a handicap, or to make the game harder for good players.
Recharger. In the vesting room there are power cables which charge and reset the guns. Usually marshals carry "pins" which are simply the plug from a charger cable used to reset guns.

Game types

Energise is the standard game of Q-ZAR. The player is given a certain number of lives. Once a player runs out of lives, they may gain a new set by going to one of their team's Energizers, but lose individual score points doing so.
Eliminator is similar to Energise, except players only have the lives they start with. Once a player runs out of lives, they are eliminated from the game. Eliminator requires reloading after every life lost.
Supercharge is a variant of Energize usually played by experienced players. Players must tag five opponents without getting tagged before they are able to de-activate their opponent's headquarters.
Stun is used for beginning players. In this mode, players have infinite lives. In Energise, players also have infinite lives but they do not get all lives at once.
Battlefield is another variation where mines (which are unused packs) are placed around the arena as obstacles.
Gauntlet is played by one person.  Their goal is to de-activate both energizers as much as they can.

Many combinations of game types, game options and arena lighting and positioning can create themed games.

Game options

The Q-ZAR software has many built in options that can be used in combination with the main game types above to create many different types of games.

Solo/Spies set the way teams are sorted. In a game of Solo, there are no teams. Players may tag other players of any color and they may re-energize at any coloured energiser and they may deactivate either color HQ. In spies, the computer chooses a random 2-minute interval for each player for them to be "spy." When a player is a Spy, they may tag any player (their team or not) for points. Spies may also be tagged by their own team. Players will know when they are spy because the pack will make a higher pitched sound when firing and the display will have four "U"s on it.  Spies and Solo are mutually exclusive. This option's default setting is off.
No Reflex Shot turns off the reflex shot. This option's default setting is off.
No Defense Shield turns off the 6-second penalty. This option's default setting is off.
Bombs allow players to hold down the trigger for three seconds to fire a bomb.  Bombs will hit any players nearby. This option's default setting is off.
HQ Reset Time is the minimum amount of time between HQ deactivation. This option's default setting is 30 seconds between HQ deactivation.
HQ Delay Time is the maximum amount of time between the two shots required to deactivate the HQ. This option's default setting is 2 seconds between shots.
Shots per Second sets how many shots can be fired in one second. This option's default setting is one shot per second.
Fun Mode/Kiddie Mode is a set of alternative sounds for Q-ZAR.

Tournaments
There are active tournament scenes in many countries across the world, including the USA, UK, Ireland, Italy, Russia, Sweden and Ecuador.  Tournament formats are the same for USA, UK and Ireland, and always use one shot per second, reflex shot and defence shields, other settings may vary depending on the actual event, with most events being Supercharge with six lives. Other countries play with settings local to their tournament scene.

Events lasting two days or more are regularly held one to five times per year in the UK and Ireland.  Italy runs a national tournament once per year, and have a Q-Zar season when teams travel to play each other home and away. The USA tournaments are infrequent as the number of centres have reduced and the player-base has dwindled.

References

Laser tag